Charles Michael Friedek (born 26 August 1971 in Gießen) is a German triple jumper who became world champion in 1999 with a jump of 17.59 metres. He had already won the World Indoor Championships the same year, with an indoor PB of 17.18 metres.

In 2002, he won a silver medal at the European Championships with 17.33 metres. At the European Indoor Championships, he won a silver medal in 1998 and gold in 2000.

Competition record

Notes

References 
 
 Leverkusen's who's who

External links 
 

1971 births
Living people
Sportspeople from Giessen
German male triple jumpers
German national athletics champions
Athletes (track and field) at the 1996 Summer Olympics
Athletes (track and field) at the 2000 Summer Olympics
Athletes (track and field) at the 2004 Summer Olympics
Olympic athletes of Germany
World Athletics Championships medalists
European Athletics Championships medalists
Universiade medalists in athletics (track and field)
Universiade silver medalists for Germany
World Athletics Indoor Championships winners
World Athletics Championships winners
Medalists at the 1999 Summer Universiade